The Montgomery Improvement Association (MIA) was formed on December 5, 1955 by black ministers and community leaders in Montgomery, Alabama. Under the leadership of Ralph Abernathy, Martin Luther King Jr. and Edgar Nixon, the MIA was instrumental in guiding the Montgomery bus boycott, a successful campaign that focused national attention on racial segregation in the South and catapulted King into the national spotlight.

History

Following Rosa Parks' arrest on December 1, 1955 for failing to vacate her seat for a white passenger on a Montgomery city bus, Jo Ann Robinson of the Women's Political Council and E. D. Nixon of the National Association for the Advancement of Colored People (NAACP) launched plans for a one-day boycott of Montgomery buses on December 5, 1955, the following Monday.

According to Jo Ann Robinson,"Regular bus routes had to be followed so that workers who "walked along" the streets could be picked up. This committee, headed by Alfonso Campbell and staffed by volunteer workers, worked all night Friday to complete this phase of the program. The pickup system was so effectively planned that many writers described it as comparable in precision to a military operation.  What the ministers failed to do at that meeting was to select one person who would head the boycott. Those present discussed it, pointing out the leadership preparation of various individuals, but no definite decision was made. That had to wait until Monday afternoon, when the ministers realized that the one day boycott was going to be successful. Then they met again, and Dr. Martin Luther King, Jr., agreed to accept the leadership post."(National Humanities Center   The Montgomery Bus Boycott and the Women Who Started It:    The Memoir of Jo Ann Gibson Robinson, ed. David J. Garrow, 1987, Ch. 2.)

Since no one knew what to expect, the empty buses were a complete surprise. The success of the boycott on December 5, and the excitement on the mass meeting on the evening of that day, removed any doubt about the strong motivation to continue the boycott. As King put it, "[t]he question of calling off the protest was now academic. The enthusiasm of these thousands of people swept everything along like an onrushing tidal wave." On the afternoon of December 5, the black leadership, consisting of civic and religious leaders of Montgomery, established the Montgomery Improvement Association. Dr. Martin Luther King Jr. was chosen to lead the MIA at the age of 26, with Ralph Abernathy, Jo Ann Robinson, E. D. Nixon, Rufus Lewis and other prominent figures at his side.

Forming the Association
At a meeting that evening attended by several thousand community members, the MIA was established to oversee the continuation and maintenance of the boycott, and King, a young minister new to Montgomery, was elected its chairman president. According to Rosa Parks, "Dr. King was chosen in part because he was relatively new to the community and so did not have any enemies." The organization's overall mission, extended beyond the boycott campaign, as it sought to "improve the general status of Montgomery, to improve race relations, and to uplift the general tenor of the community."

After the MIA's initial meeting, the executive committee drafted the demands of the boycott and agreed that the campaign would continue until demands were met. Their demands included courteous treatment by bus operators, first-come, first-served seating, and employment of African American bus drivers.

Thus, despite the Supreme Court's decision in Brown v. Board of Education, the MIA was initially willing to accept a compromise that was consistent with separate but equal rather than complete integration.  In this respect, it followed the pattern of earlier boycott campaigns in the Deep South during the 1950s.  A prime example was the successful boycott of service stations in Mississippi for refusing to provide restrooms for blacks.  The organizer of that campaign, T.R.M. Howard of the Regional Council of Negro Leadership, had spoken in Montgomery as King's guest at the Dexter Avenue Baptist Church only days before Parks's arrest.

Over the next year, the MIA organized carpools and held weekly gatherings with sermons and music to keep the black community mobilized. Also during this time period, officers of the organization negotiated with Montgomery city leaders, coordinated legal challenges with the NAACP to the city's bus segregation ordinance, and supported the boycott financially, raising money by passing the plate at meetings and soliciting support from northern and southern civil rights organizations.

Victory
Following its success in Montgomery, the MIA became one of the founding organizations of the Southern Christian Leadership Conference (SCLC) in January 1957. The MIA lost some vital momentum after King moved from Montgomery to Atlanta in 1960, but the organization continued campaigns throughout the 1960s, focusing on voter registration, local school integration, and the integration of Montgomery city parks. Although it lost momentum, it did however improve the life of black people living in Montgomery after the boycott.

People
Jefferson Underwood II
Ralph Abernathy
Rosa Parks
Hugo Black
James F. Blake
Aurelia Browder
Johnnie Carr
Claudette Colvin
Clifford Durr
Georgia Gilmore
Robert Graetz
Fred Gray
Grover Hall Junior.
T. R. M. Howard
Martin Luther King Jr.
Coretta Scott King
Susie McDonald
E.D. Nixon
Mother Pollard
Jo Ann Robinson
Bayard Rustin
Glenn Smiley
Mary Louise Smith
Debbie Jones formerly Abbie Medlock

Organizations
Women's Political Council 
Montgomery Improvement Association 
Fellowship of Reconciliation
Congress of Racial Equality
Southern Christian Leadership Conference 
Committee for Nonviolent Integration
Men of Montgomery
National Association for the Advancement of Colored People

See also
 Browder v. Gayle

References

Further reading
 My Soul Is Rested, The Story Of The Civil Rights Movement In The Deep South, by Howell Raines,  
 Parting The Waters; America In The King Years 1954-63, by Taylor Branch,  
 Stride Toward Freedom, by Martin Luther King Jr.,  
 The Origins Of The Civil Rights Movement, Black Communities Organizing For Change, by Aldon D. Morris,  
 Eyes on The Prize, America's Civil Rights Years 1954-1965,  by Juan Williams,  
 Eyes on The Prize Civil Rights Reader, documents, speeches, and first hand accounts from the black freedom struggle, Ed. Clayborne Carson, David J. Garrow, Gerabld Gill, Vincent Harding, Darlene Clark Hine, p. 45 - 60,  
 Mary Fair Burks, "Trailblazers: Women in the Montgomery Bus Boycott," in Vicki L. Crawford, *Jacqueline Anne Rouse and Barbara Woods, eds., Women in the Civil Rights Movement (Bloomington: Indiana University Press, 1990) 
 Clayborne Carson, Stewart Burns, Susan Carson, Peter Holloran & Dana L. H. Powell, eds., The Papers of Martin Luther King, Jr., Volume III: Birth of a New Age, December 1955–December 1956 (Berkeley: University of California Press, 1997) 
 Clayborne Carson, ed., The Autobiography of Martin Luther King, Jr. (New York: Warner Books, 1998) 
 Robert Graetz, A White Preacher's Memoir: The Montgomery Bus Boycott (Black Belt Press, 1999.)
 Martin Luther King, Jr., Stride Toward Freedom: the Montgomery Story (New York: Harper & Row, 1958) 
 Aldon Morris, The Origins of the Civil Rights Movement: Black Communities Organizing for Change (New York: The Free Press, 1994) 
 Howell Raines, My Soul is Rested: Movement Days in the Deep South Remembered (New York: Puttnam, 1977) 
 Jo Ann Robinson, The Montgomery Bus Boycott and the Women Who Started It (Knoxville, Tennessee: University of Tennessee Press, 1987) "MIA Mass Meeting at Holt Street Baptist Church," 5 December 1955 
 "To the Montgomery Public," advertisement submitted by King and the MIA to the Sunday Advertiser and Alabama Journal, 25 December 1955 
 King's address to MIA Mass Meeting at Day Street Baptist Church, 26 April 1956 
 King's address to MIA Mass Meeting at Holt Street Baptist Church, 14 November 1956
 The Jack Rabin Collection on Alabama Civil Rights and Southern Activists, including materials from and oral history of MIA officials, at Penn State University Library 

1955 establishments in Alabama
African Americans' rights organizations
Civil rights movement
History of Montgomery, Alabama
African-American history in Montgomery, Alabama
Montgomery bus boycott